Oliver Leonard Kirk (April 20, 1884 – March 14, 1960) was an American bantamweight and featherweight professional boxer who won two gold medals in Boxing at the 1904 Summer Olympics. He was born in Beatrice, Nebraska and died in St. Louis, Missouri.

Kirk is the only boxer in Olympic history to ever win two gold medals in two separate weight divisions at the same Olympics. He won gold in the featherweight and lost almost 10 pounds in under two weeks and also won gold in the bantamweight category. Kirk only had to win two fights to capture his two gold medals, in the bantamweight class only two boxers competed. In the featherweight class there were three boxers with Kirk earning the bye in the first round.

References

External links
 
 

1884 births
1960 deaths
Boxers from Nebraska
Bantamweight boxers
Featherweight boxers
Olympic boxers of the United States
Boxers at the 1904 Summer Olympics
Olympic gold medalists for the United States in boxing
Place of birth missing
People from Beatrice, Nebraska
American male boxers
Medalists at the 1904 Summer Olympics